Jo Galletly (born 18 July 1979) is a New Zealand field hockey player who competed in the 2008 Summer Olympics.

References

External links
 

1979 births
Living people
New Zealand female field hockey players
New Zealand people of Scottish descent
Olympic field hockey players of New Zealand
Field hockey players at the 2008 Summer Olympics
21st-century New Zealand women